Renato Guerino Turano (2 October 1942 – 5 December 2021) was an Italian and American politician and businessman. He served in the Italian Senate from 2006 to 2008 as a representative of Italian citizens in North America and Central America and was re-elected to the same position in the 2013 Italian general election.

Early life and private career
Turano was born in Castrolibero, Calabria, Italy, and moved to the United States with his family at age fifteen. He attended the University of Illinois at Chicago from 1962 to 1966 and returned in 1990 for a Master of Business Administration (MBA) degree. Turano also held an Honorary Doctorate in Letters from the University of Wisconsin-Parkside.

Turano's family purchased a small Chicago baking company in 1962, renamed it as the Turano Baking Company, and eventually built it into one of the largest artisan bread producers in North America. Turano worked for the company in his youth and became its president and chief executive officer in 1982. He served as chair of the American Bakers Associations (ABA) in the 2000s and led a march of eighty bakers to Capitol Hill to lobby for sector relief during a commodity crisis affecting wheat. In 2009, he was described as one of the twenty most influential baking managers in America.

Turano has been active in the Italian-American community for several decades. He founded Chicago's Casa Italia, served on the National Italian American Foundation (NAIF), and from 1996 to 2006 was an American consulate to the Region of Calabria, representing Calabrian Americans at annual conferences in Italy. Turano received a special achievement award from the NIAF for public service in 2007.

Senator
Turano was elected to the Italian Senate in the 2006 general election, the first in which persons with Italian citizenship living overseas were able to elect their own representatives. Turano was elected to represent voters in North America and Central America, and he credited Canadian support as vital to his victory. His party, Romano Prodi's The Union, won the election, and Turano helped consolidate its narrow majority in the Senate. A political moderate, he defended the Prodi administration's centrist course in a 2006 interview with the Chicago Tribune, saying that the government was shifting Italy from its recent "quasi-socialistic" history.

Turano sought re-election in the 2008 general election, but was unsuccessful. Turano actually received more first preference votes than any other candidate in North and Central America, but the governing coalition's party list (renamed as the Democratic Party) narrowly lost to Silvio Berlusconi's People of Freedom.

He was re-elected in the 2013 general election, again as a candidate of the Democratic Party.

Electoral record

References

External links
Partito Democratico page (in Italian)
Senate biography (in Italian)

1942 births
2021 deaths
People from the Province of Cosenza
Democratic Party (Italy) politicians
Senators of Legislature XV of Italy
Senators of Legislature XVII of Italy
Italian emigrants to the United States
Politicians from Chicago
University of Illinois Chicago alumni